The 1991 New York Mets season was the 30th regular season for the Mets. They went 77-84 and finished fifth in the National League East for their first losing season since 1983. They were managed by Bud Harrelson and Mike Cubbage. They played home games at Shea Stadium.

Offseason
 November 13, 1990: Chris Jelic was released by the New York Mets.
 December 15, 1990: Bob Ojeda and Greg Hansell were traded by the Mets to the Los Angeles Dodgers for Hubie Brooks.
 January 21, 1991: Rick Cerone was signed as a free agent by the Mets.

Regular season
Howard Johnson set the Mets record for most RBIs in one season with 117.

Opening Day starters

Season standings

Record vs. opponents

Notable transactions
 April 2, 1991: Alex Diaz and Darren Reed were traded by the Mets to the Montreal Expos for David Sommer (minors) and Terrel Hansen (minors).
 June 3, 1991: 1991 Major League Baseball Draft
Bill Pulsipher was drafted by the Mets in the 2nd round. Player signed August 22, 1991.
Jason Isringhausen was drafted by the Mets in the 44th round. Player signed May 24, 1992.
 July 15, 1991: Ron Darling and Mike Thomas were traded by the Mets to the Montreal Expos for Tim Burke.

Roster

Player stats

Batting

Starters by position
Note: Pos = Position; G = Games played; AB = At bats; H = Hits; Avg. = Batting average; HR = Home runs; RBI = Runs batted in

Other batters
Note: G = Games played; AB = At bats; H = Hits; Avg. = Batting average; HR = Home runs; RBI = Runs batted in

Pitching

Starting pitchers 
Note: G = Games pitched; IP = Innings pitched; W = Wins; L = Losses; ERA = Earned run average; SO = Strikeouts

Other pitchers 
Note: G = Games pitched; IP = Innings pitched; W = Wins; L = Losses; ERA = Earned run average; SO = Strikeouts

Relief pitchers 
Note: G = Games pitched; W = Wins; L = Losses; SV = Saves; ERA = Earned run average; SO = Strikeouts

Awards and honors

League leaders 
 Howard Johnson – National League leader, home runs (38)
 Howard Johnson – National League leader, RBI (117)

All-Stars 
Frank Viola, Howard Johnson 
1991 Major League Baseball All-Star Game

Farm system 

LEAGUE CHAMPIONS: Columbia

References

External links
1991 New York Mets at Baseball Reference
1991 New York Mets team page at www.baseball-almanac.com

New York Mets seasons
New York Mets season
New York Mets
1990s in Queens